Pacarina puella, the little mesquite cicada, is a species of cicada in the family Cicadidae. It is found in Central America and North America.

References

Further reading

External links

 

Insects described in 1923
Fidicinini